Silvester Takač (Serbian ; born 8 November 1940) is a Serbian-Yugoslavian former football forward and manager. He was part of the Yugoslav squad that won gold at the 1960 Summer Olympics.

Honours

Manager
OGC Nice
 Coupe de France: 1997

References

External links
 
  
 
 
 

1940 births
Living people
Association football forwards
Serbian footballers
Yugoslav footballers
Yugoslav expatriate footballers
Yugoslavia international footballers
FK Vojvodina players
Stade Rennais F.C. players
Serbian expatriate footballers
Expatriate footballers in France
Expatriate footballers in Belgium
Standard Liège players
Yugoslav First League players
Ligue 1 players
Belgian Pro League players
Yugoslav football managers
Serbian football managers
RFC Liège managers
FC Sochaux-Montbéliard managers
US Créteil-Lusitanos managers
OGC Nice managers
Olympic footballers of Yugoslavia
Olympic gold medalists for Yugoslavia
Expatriate football managers in Belgium
Expatriate football managers in France
Footballers at the 1960 Summer Olympics
Footballers at the 1964 Summer Olympics
Ligue 1 managers
Olympic medalists in football
Raja CA managers
CS Sfaxien managers
Racing Club de France Football managers
Medalists at the 1960 Summer Olympics
Serbian expatriate football managers
UEFA Champions League top scorers
Botola managers